Choi Hyun-suk (Korean: 최현석; born April 21, 1999) is a South Korean rapper, dancer, and one of two leaders of Treasure with Jihoon under YG Entertainment. The band debuted on August 7, 2020, with the single album entitled The First Step: Chapter One. He is also known for his television appearance on Mix Nine (2017) as a contestant.

Life and career

1999–2016: Early life 
Choi Hyun-suk was born on April 21, 1999, in South Korea. He is the eldest in his family and has a younger sister. 8-year-old Choi (Korean age) grew an interest for rap and hip hop after he watched Big Bang's documentary, The Beginning (2006). In result, he solely fixated his eyes on the hip hop label, YG Entertainment. He formally encountered hip hop and began to dance at ages 11–12 and 13–14 (Korean ages) respectively, and soon aspired to become an artist. Alternatively, he wished to become a footballer, stemming from his interest in the sport and his stance as an avid fan of Real Madrid CF. In his adolescence, he enrolled at an academy called "V-Spec" for lessons and attended a private audition held by YG Entertainment through the facility. Choi was recruited in its trainee program in 2015, and dropped out of Chungdam High School the day after at his own will. Choi completed his secondary education through a High School Proficiency Assessment.

2017–present: Career beginnings and debut with Treasure 

Choi first appeared on television through Mix Nine (2017–2018) with his band-mate, Kim Jun-kyu, and Lee Byoung-gon of CIX. He participated as a contestant representing YG Entertainment in the midst of his training and finished the show in fifth place, earning a place in the final line-up. The winning contestants' agencies, however, were unable to reach an agreement regarding the tenure of the project band, and so, 
lead to the abolishment of its debut. That same year, Choi was incorporated in the third episode of YG Future Strategy Office (2018) as himself while filmed alongside other trainees from the agency. 

20-year-old Choi (Korean age) competed in YG Treasure Box (2018–2019) — a survival-reality program composed of twenty nine trainees — as one seventh of "Team A". The broadcast documented the formation of YG Entertainment's next boy band, Treasure. He became the seventh and last member to join the septet, however, with the announcement of a second line-up and the ensuing merge, the initial septet became the eventual 12-piece ensemble. Choi was notified of his addition to the band by his parents subsequently after its revelation by the news reporters. In the midst of its preparation for debut, Choi featured on the B-side single, "1, 2" (한두번; handubeon) by label-mate Lee Hi from her extended play titled 24°C and participated as its lyricist. He also served as an "unofficial leader" with Jihoon in their respective teams when they were divided into two for training due to the number of members. His training period came to an end after five years, followed his debut in Treasure on August 7, 2020, with the single album entitled The First Step: Chapter One. The band adopted the two-tier leadership with Choi and Jihoon in the frontlines after seeing positive aspects from the once temporary system.

Artistry

Influences 
Choi cited G-Dragon and Taeyang of Big Bang alongside American artists Kendrick Lamar, Asap Mob and XXXTentacion as influences towards rap and hip hop.

Other ventures

Endorsements 
In January 2018, Choi modeled for Japanese sports clothing and accessories brand, Descente, for their new semester menswear range.

Philanthropy 
In 2022, Choi participated in the "News 1 Bazaar of Love" through an invitation by the South Korean news agency, News 1. All proceeds were provided for the treatment and care of children with severe, rare and intractable diseases and children of low-income families through items from various celebrities.

Discography

As a featured artist

Production credits 
All song credits are adapted from the Korea Music Copyright Association's database, unless otherwise noted.

Work as Treasure

Other artists

Filmography

Television series

Web series

Television shows

References

External links 

1999 births
Living people
People from Seoul
Rappers from Seoul
K-pop singers
Treasure (band) members
South Korean male idols
South Korean hip hop singers
South Korean dance musicians
YG Entertainment artists
21st-century South Korean  male singers
Japanese-language singers of South Korea
Mix Nine contestants